"Makeba" is a song by French singer-songwriter Jain released on 6 November 2015 from her debut studio album Zanaka (2015). Written by herself, the song was produced by her long-time collaborator Maxim Nucci. The song peaked at number seven on the French Singles Chart.

The song references Miriam Makeba, also known as "Mama Africa", a South African singer and activist.

Music video
The three-minute and forty-three-second music video for the song "Makeba" was released in November 2016 on Jain's official YouTube channel. The video shows a lot of visual illusions and creativity. It opens with the last frame of Jain's song "Come" from the same album Zanaka, as she crumples the frame from the camera as if it was a paper and walks to the right of the screen. As Jain turns knobs on the sound deck, street poles rise up or fall down, and buildings rise and lower. From crates being packed on top of each other to simulate the beat and volume, and Jain herself painting the lines on a zebra, the music video is filled with artsy illusions.

The music video, shot in South Africa, was nominated for a Grammy Award.

Charts

Weekly charts

Year-end charts

Certifications

In popular culture 
"Makeba" was used in the American Dad! episode "A Whole Slotta Love" (S13 E8), the Levi's "Circles" television commercial, the Mitsubishi Eclipse Cross television commercial, and an episode (S2 E3) of the BBC3 drama Clique. It is also used as the theme for Amazon's Premier League Football Coverage. Former European Figure Skating Champion Sofia Samadourva used this song in her 2020–2021 free program.  Its also featured in a 2022-23 TV commercial for Marshall's clothing store.

References

2015 singles
2015 songs